Michael Cornell (born December 5, 1986) is a professional Canadian football linebacker. He went undrafted in the 2009 CFL Draft. He played CIS football for the Ottawa Gee-Gees. He started his professional career playing for the Calgary Stampeders of the Canadian Football League, but was released on May 10, 2011. He is currently playing for the Edmonton Eskimos of the CFL.

References

External links
Winnipeg Blue Bombers bio 
Edmonton Eskimos player bio
Ottawa Gee-Gees bio

1986 births
Living people
Calgary Stampeders players
Canadian football linebackers
Edmonton Elks players
Winnipeg Blue Bombers players
Ottawa Gee-Gees football players
Sportspeople from Hamilton, Ontario
Players of Canadian football from Ontario